Haluzice may refer to places:

Haluzice, Nové Mesto nad Váhom District, a municipality and village in Slovakia
Haluzice (Zlín District), a municipality and village in the Czech Republic